Skyy Line  is the fourth  album  by New York City based  group Skyy released in 1981  on  Salsoul Records.

Track listing

Personnel
Randy Muller - Flute, Keyboards, Percussion
Solomon Roberts, Jr. - Guitar, Vocals
Gerald Lebon - Bass
Tommy McConnell - Drums
Anibal "Butch" Sierra - Guitar
Larry Greenberg - Keyboards
Bonny Dunning, Delores Dunning Milligan, Denise Dunning Crawford - Vocals

Charts

Weekly charts

Year-end charts

Singles

See also
List of number-one R&B albums of 1982 (U.S.)

References

External links
 Skyy-Skyy Line  at Discogs

1981 albums
Skyy (band) albums
Salsoul Records albums